Wolf Branch is a stream in Knox County in the U.S. state of Missouri. It is a tributary of Little Bridge Creek.

Wolf Branch was named for the wolves seen in the area.

See also
List of rivers of Missouri

References

Rivers of Knox County, Missouri
Rivers of Missouri